FC Serp i Molot Moscow (meaning "Sickle and Hammer") was a Soviet and now Russian football team of the city of Moscow.

Football

History
Serp i Molot won the Soviet First League in Summer 1936, and won promotion to the Soviet Top League. During the 1938 season, they finished third.

Name changes:
1923—1924 — AKS
1925—1930 — RkimA
1936 — Serp i Molot
1937—1962 — Metallurg
1963-19?? — Serp i Molot
2000 — Serp i Molot-SNS
2001 — Serp i Molot Tusom
2005 — FC Maccabi Moscow was formed on the basis of ex-Serp i Molot
2009 — FC Serp i Molot (reborn)

Current
Currently, they play in the Moscow Amateur League (LFL MRO-Centre).

Bandy
The women's bandy team of the club won the Russian championship in 1989, 1990, 1991, and 1992.

External links
 Metallurg stadium site 

Defunct football clubs in Moscow
Soviet Top League clubs